Colors Cineplex Superhits launched on 1 April 2022. Rishtey Cineplex got rebranded into Colors Cineplex Superhits.

Earlier, the channel used to broadcast both Bollywood and South Indian movies dubbed in Hindi. But after the launch of Colors Cineplex Bollywood on 1 April 2021, the channel broadcasts only South Indian Hindi-dubbed movies while the latter is a dedicated Bollywood movies channel.

Original shows 
 A Cricket Tournament - Road Safety World Series is a T20 cricket competition organised by the Road Safety Cell of Maharashtra to raise awareness about road safety. In the Road safety world series, Cricket world Legends will match against each other for a noble cause. It will be a series of 11 matches that will be played in the T20 format. The series features some big names in cricket from India, Australia, Sri Lanka, West Indies and South Africa like Sachin Tendulkar, Virender Sehwag, Yuvraj Singh, Zaheer Khan, Brian Lara, Shivnarine Chanderpaul, etc. and Former India captain Sunil Gavaskar is the commissioner of the series. The series was aired from 7 to 22 March 2020 on Colors Cineplex at 6pm. Mr. Ravi Gaikwad, Chief of RTO, Thane (Konkan Range), Government of Maharashtra, is the founder of the Road Safety World Series, who integrated concept of Road Safety with sports to save lives on Indian roads and across the globe.

The man who has been supporting for the cause of road safety is Mr. Ravi Gaikwad, Senior Member of Road Safety Cell, Government of Maharashtra.

Ravi Gaikwad, Chairman of Shant Bharat Surakshit Bharat appreciated Yohan Blake's visit to India and his efforts for road safety campaign, which required the need to educate the people and make them aware of their responsibilities so as to save as many lives as possible on Indian roads.

 T10 League – Abu Dhabi T10 League season 5 was broadcast on the channel along with Colors Cineplex and Voot.

References 

Viacom 18
Movie channels in India
Television channels and stations established in 2020
Hindi-language television stations
Television stations in Mumbai
Hindi-language television channels in India